Joy Jobbins (born 5 September 1927 in Sydney, Australia) is the former head of advertising for The Australian Wool Board, and now author of a book called, "Shoestring: a memoir".

Biography
Her father was cinesound cameraman George Malcolm, a pioneer in the Australian film industry; her brother, Ken Malcolm  was also in the film industry, working variously as a sound recordist and editor.

She went to Bondi Public School, and later studied art at the East Sydney Tech College.

In 1950, she went to work at Anthony Horden's Department Store where she met, and later married Henry Edward Jobbins.

She worked as a script supervisor on the propaganda film "A Yank Down Under", about R&R leave in Sydney during World War II.

She subsequently modelled swim suits for Coles of California Swimwear (a New Zealand Company).

Joy Jobbins is the mother of comedian/writer Saturday Rosenberg; Camden Jobbins and Sheridan Jobbins.  She is also the stepmother of Cobbitty Jobbins and Boak Jobbins.

After she married, she moved to Eltham, Victoria where she went to work at Carden's Advertising, working on campaigns for Terylene, House of Leroy. Later she left and joined Ralph Blunden's agency where she took control of the Australian Wool Board account working in collaboration with models, photographers and illustrators such as Maggie Tabberer, Henry Talbot, Helmut Newton, Patrick Russell, Des O'Brien, Barbara Robertson and others.

In 1959, she played an important role in the inaugural Australian Fashion Awards.

She subsequently left Blunden Advertising and worked directly for the Australian Wool Board from 1964 until 1972 when she left to publish a tourism magazine called, "Australia for Players and Stayers.

References

External links
 National Libraries of Australia
 Personal website
 The Australian
 Powerhouse Museum

1927 births
Living people
Australian memoirists
Writers from Melbourne
People from Sydney
Australian women memoirists
Women biographers